Carmel Hanna MLA (née McAleenan; 26 April 1946, in Warrenpoint, County Down, Northern Ireland) is an Irish politician. She is a member of the SDLP and was MLA for South Belfast from 1998 to 2010.

Early life and nursing career
Born as Carmel McAleenan, the seventh of nine children, her father was a factory worker in a local packaging plant. She was educated at Star of the Sea Primary School in Warrenpoint, and Our Lady's Grammar School, Newry.

She came to Belfast in 1964 to train as a nurse at Belfast City Hospital and qualified there as Registered Nurse in 1967 and later in 1970 at the Royal Maternity Hospital as a State Certified Midwife. She worked in hospitals in Northern Ireland, Republic of Ireland, Great Britain and mainland Europe.

After living and working abroad (which gave her a long-term interest in third world development), she returned to Northern Ireland to work as a staff nurse in the Casualty department at the Mater Hospital, Crumlin Road, at the height of the Troubles. Her experiences there made an indelible impression and strengthened her belief that political change must be made by peaceful means. She was active in the Northern Ireland Civil Rights Campaign of the early 1970s. 

She married Eamon Hanna in 1973. They have four adult children and they have lived and worked in Belfast, Dublin, Galway and the United States. In 1987 Carmel returned to work as a nurse and subsequently transferred to social services working for the South & East Belfast Trust assessing domiciliary care for the elderly. She also became an officer for her trade union, NIPSA.

Political career
Carmel first joined the SDLP in 1972 and was an ordinary member for many years as well as being secretary and committee member of the Galway and Dublin SDLP support groups. She became chairperson of her local branch in 1996, in which year she was also an SDLP candidate in a Belfast City Council by election and Northern Ireland Forum elections.

She was elected to Belfast City Council for the Balmoral area in 1997. Her committee duties include Planning, Health & Environment and Cultural Diversity. She was elected to Northern Ireland Assembly in June 1998. Hanna was Deputy Chair of the Environment Committee in the Northern Ireland Assembly until December 2001. She was appointed as Minister of Employment and Learning in December 2001. 

During that period she:

Reformed third level student funding which NUS/USI has acknowledged as being the fairest in the UK and which increased grants for the least well off
Put family-friendly legislation  on the statute book, giving statutory paternity leave and extended maternity leave for both natural and adoptive parents, as well as the right to unpaid parental leave and flexible working time for parents with children under five and children up to eighteen with a disability.
Developed radical initiatives to enhance employability and tackle long-term unemployment
Gave lifelong learning increased status and resources to tackle adult literacy and numeracy issues.

Her ministerial career ended in October 2002 when the Northern Ireland Assembly was suspended as a result of the 'Stormontgate' affair.

Carmel Hanna was founder and chair of the All-Party Group on International Development in the Assembly and, following her resignation from the Assembly in 2010, she worked with Voluntary Service Overseas in Namibia. Following the publication of the Murphy and Ryan Reports into institutional child abuse in state and church-run homes in the Irish Republic,  Carmel Hanna  tabled a motion in the Assembly on 2 December 2009 calling for a similar inquiry in Northern Ireland. The motion was passed unanimously and led to the setting up of the Hart Inquiry.

Her stated major political aims are:
Preserving and enhancing South Belfast's townscape character
Improving health, education and social services
Retaining maternity services at the Jubilee hospital
Working on social justice and cultural issues
Working for social inclusion

First diagnosed with cancer in 2000, she resigned on 18 January 2010 as an MLA on grounds of ill-health. She received a Lifetime Achievement award in 2010 from the Royal College of Nursing Northern Ireland for her services to nursing; for many years she was the only serving registered nurse in the Assembly. Conall McDevitt was sworn in to replace her on 21 January 2010. Regarding her resignation, SDLP leader Mark Durkan said: "Carmel Hanna has served her constituents of South Belfast, the people of Northern Ireland and the wider SDLP with dignity, determination and dedication during a distinguished political career as a councillor, assembly member and as a minister."

She is the mother of Claire Hanna, who was elected as an SDLP Belfast City councillor for Balmoral in 2011 and served as an SDLP MLA for Belfast South from 2015 to 2019, when she was elected to represent Belfast South in parliament in Westminster.

References

External links
Profile at SDLP website

Living people
1946 births
British midwives
Members of Belfast City Council
Social Democratic and Labour Party MLAs
Northern Ireland MLAs 1998–2003
Northern Ireland MLAs 2003–2007
Northern Ireland MLAs 2007–2011
Ministers of the Northern Ireland Executive (since 1999)
Female members of the Northern Ireland Assembly
People from Warrenpoint
Women ministers of the Northern Ireland Executive
20th-century women politicians from Northern Ireland
21st-century women politicians from Northern Ireland
Women councillors in Northern Ireland